George Frederick Fink (born c. 1940) is a Canadian retired curler. He played as third on the Ron Northcott rink that won the 1966 Brier and World Championship. He later worked in the oil and gas business, serving as CEO and President of multiple companies. At the time of the 1966 Brier, he was employed by Clarkson Gordon & Co.

References

External links
 
 George Fink – Curling Canada Stats Archive
 Video:  (YouTube-channel «Curling Canada»)

Living people
Curlers from Alberta
1940s births
Brier champions
World curling champions
Canadian male curlers
20th-century Canadian people